Stanislav Bocharov (born June 20, 1991) is a Russian professional ice hockey player who currently plays for Amur Khabarovsk of the Kontinental Hockey League (KHL). He previously played with Avtomobilist Yekaterinburg joining from Torpedo Nizhny Novgorod, after agreeing to a two-year contract as a free agent on 3 May 2020.

References

External links 

1991 births
Living people
Admiral Vladivostok players
Ak Bars Kazan players
Amur Khabarovsk players
Avtomobilist Yekaterinburg players
HC Lada Togliatti players
Sportspeople from Khabarovsk
Russian ice hockey left wingers
Salavat Yulaev Ufa players
HC Sochi players
Torpedo Nizhny Novgorod players
HC Yugra players